Better Farming is a monthly magazine focusing on the business of farming in Ontario. As of 2016 it was the largest-circulation periodical serving Ontario's commercial farmers.

Better Farming was founded in 1999 in Toronto and is owned by Ag Media. Paul Nolan is the publisher of the magazine which is a general circulation magazine, and is also delivered as a benefit to all members of the Ontario Federation of Agriculture (OFA).

Better Farming also launched a Prairies version of the magazine, to bring this powerful editorial content to farmers in Manitoba, Saskatchewan and Alberta.

References

External links

1999 establishments in Ontario
Agricultural magazines
Magazines established in 1999
Magazines published in Toronto
Monthly magazines published in Canada